
Waña Quta (Aymara waña dry, quta lake, "dry lake", hispanicized spelling Huana Kkota) is a lake in Bolivia in the La Paz Department, Inquisivi Province, Ichoca Municipality, Ichoca Canton. It lies south east of the Kimsa Cruz mountain range, the village and the mountain Waña Quta. The lake is about 0.5 km long and 0.4 km at its widest point and situated at a height of about 4,761 metres (15,620 ft).

See also 
 Wallatani

References 

Lakes of La Paz Department (Bolivia)